The  was an infantry division in the Imperial Japanese Army. It was created 4 April 1944 in Kurume, simultaneously with the 44th and 81st divisions. It was a triangular division. The divisional backbone was the 56th division headquarters.

Action
The 86th division was assigned to the Western District Army upon formation, and garrisoned Miyakonojō. It was transferred to 57th army and tasked with the coastal defense of Shibushi, Kagoshima a year later, 8 April 1945. Because Operation Downfall was never implemented, the 86th division has spent time until surrender of Japan 15 August 1945 fortifying positions without seeing an actual combat.

References and further reading

 List of Japanese Infantry Divisions
 Madej, W. Victor. Japanese Armed Forces Order of Battle, 1937-1945 [2 vols] Allentown, PA: 1981
This article incorporates material from the article 第86師団 (日本軍) in the Japanese Wikipedia, retrieved on 21 June 2016.

Japanese World War II divisions
Infantry divisions of Japan
Military units and formations established in 1944
Military units and formations disestablished in 1945
1944 establishments in Japan
1945 disestablishments in Japan